Cross-country skiing has been contested at the Winter Paralympic Games since the first Winter Games in 1976.

Summary

Events

Medal table 
 NPCs in italics no longer compete at the Winter Paralympics

As of 2022 Winter Paralympics

Nations

See also

Cross-country skiing at the Winter Olympics

References

 
Sports at the Winter Paralympics
Paralympics
Nordic skiing at the Winter Paralympics